The West Midlands Combined Authority (WMCA) is a combined authority for the West Midlands metropolitan county in the United Kingdom. It was established by statutory instrument under the Local Democracy, Economic Development and Construction Act 2009. It is a strategic authority with powers over transport, economic development and regeneration. The authority formally came into being on 17 June 2016.

Structure
The authority consists of seven indirectly elected constituent members, each a directly elected councillor from one of the seven West Midlands county local authorities, as well as the Mayor of the West Midlands, who is directly elected by the county's residents.

There are currently thirteen non-constituent members, made up of three Local Enterprise Partnerships, as well as ten local authorities from outside the West Midlands county. There are also four 'observer organisations' (organisations awaiting non-constituent membership and non-voting observers).

History
The abolition of the West Midlands County Council in 1986 left the county without a single authority covering the whole area, although some council functions continued to be provided jointly, through the West Midlands Joint Committee, the West Midlands Integrated Transport Authority, West Midlands Police (initially under the oversight of the West Midlands Police Authority and currently overseen by the directly elected West Midlands Police and Crime Commissioner) and West Midlands Fire Service.

The authority has previously (incorrectly) been referred to as the Greater Birmingham Combined Authority, or simply Greater Birmingham, as the final model and membership was worked out and negotiated. Greater Birmingham is a term present in the current Local Enterprise Partnership which serves Birmingham, Solihull and some additional local council areas within the West Midlands.

Organisation
The authority's initial priorities will involve co-ordinating the city-region to act as one place on certain issues, such as international promotion and investment; reforming public services such as mental health services; and improving internal and external transport links.

Transport for West Midlands 

Transport for West Midlands (TfWM) is an executive body of the WMCA that oversees transportation (road, rail, bus and Metro) within the metropolitan county. The organisation carries over the previous responsibilities of Centro (the West Midlands Passenger Transport Executive). TfWM has a similar level of responsibility to Transport for London - although its responsibility with highways is limited to a defined set of major routes (the West Midlands Key Route Network). TfWM's policies and strategy are set by the WMCA's transport delivery committee.

Transport for West Midlands operates the West Midlands Metro tram system, and is currently expanding the system from Birmingham City centre to Birmingham Airport, and to the west to Brierley Hill via the Merry Hill Shopping Centre. Metro extensions are planned and constructed through the Midland Metro Alliance, of which TfWM is a member.

TfWM is also looking at improvements to the M5 and M6 motorways, and new cycles routes as part of a metropolitan cycle network. There are also plans to work with central government over the future of the underused M6 Toll.

Housing and planning 
While local planning will remain in the hands of the seven boroughs, the WMCA will be able to analyse county-wide brownfield sites and decide where new homes should be built.

Health 
A mental health commission was formed in order to create a reformed mental healthcare system in the county. The WMCA will not, however, have control over a devolved NHS budget as is the case in Greater Manchester.

Youth Engagement 
The WMCA co-runs the West Midlands Young Combined Authority with Birmingham-based organisation Aspire4U CIC, via it's specific project named LyfeProof since June 2021 and originally with The Beatfreeks Collective between September 2019 and May 2021. The YCA held membership of 33 16-25 year olds from all seven constituent members, upon establishment in September 2019. The YCA has a co-opted membership of the Combined Authority Board, with members issuing updates of Young Combined Authority work, at each WMCA Board meeting since January 2020.

At the close of the first session of the YCA in August 2020, the number of members had reduced to 16, and it was agreed that the YCA would adopt a bicameral approach to its operation, featuring a core YCA board, combined with a YCA community, who would comment on the work of the WMCA and YCA.

The YCA board was reformed in September 2020, and between October 2020-November 2021 was co-chaired by Aisha Masood, a member from Birmingham, and Chris Burden, from Wolverhampton, who was elected Councillor for the Fallings Park ward, at the 2021 Wolverhampton City Council election.

The body, which after further recuritment had approx. 25 members and was chaired in 2021-2022 by Kashmire Hawker of Wolverhampton, a candidate for Tettenhall Regis at the 2022 City of Wolverhampton Council election and Lily Eaves of Coventry. It functions as a scrutiny and campaign body, and for 2020/21 had Co-Leads who dedicated to comment and engaged on the work of relevant WMCA portfolio leads. In November 2021, the YCA were awarded The Chair's Award, at the Royal Town Planning Institute's West Midlands Awards for Planning Excellence, for the publication of a Vision and Priorities document in February 2021.

A further review of the YCA's structure was undertaken in Autumn 2022, with detail on specific's to be confirmed.

Mayor of West Midlands 

In 2017, the West Midlands, like several other city regions, elected a 'metro mayor' with similar powers to the Mayor of London. The date of the first mayoral election was 4 May 2017. The election was won by Andy Street of the Conservative Party, with 50.4% of the votes in the second round against then Labour Party Member of the European Parliament for the West Midlands in Sion Simon, which was then followed by a near Landslide victory in May 2021's election, seeing him receive 54.04% of the second round vote against Birmingham Hodge Hill's Labour Party Member of Parliament in Liam Byrne.

A directly elected mayor for the combined authority area was described as 'inevitable', as such a role has been stated as a conditional requirement for a more powerful devolution deal. The WMCA shadow board submitted proposals for a combined authority with and without a mayor leader, and decided which plan of action to take based on the devolution proposals from the government for each. Powers sought for a regional metro mayor and the WMCA were first revealed in a leaked bid document first reported by Simon Gilbert, of the Coventry Telegraph. Those powers included the ability of the mayor to levy extra business rates from companies in the region. Negotiations also included the desire to take away the ability of local councils to retain future business rates growth and to hand that cash to the WMCA, who would decide how it was spent across the region instead of by individual local authorities.

Membership

As of May 2022, the Combined Authority's Portfolio Holders and membership of the Combined Authority's Board are as follows:

Colour key (for political parties): 

Colour key (for political parties):

See also
 Combined authority
 Transport for West Midlands
 West Midlands Police and Crime Commissioner
 Greater Birmingham and Solihull Local Enterprise Partnership
 West Midlands County Council
 Evolution of Worcestershire county boundaries since 1844

References

External links
 

Combined authorities
Local government in the West Midlands (county)